Keeripatti is a Town Panchayat in Attur taluk of Salem district in the Indian state of Tamil Nadu. It is famous for jallikattu, a culture there. Keeripatti is surrounded by mountains on all sides.

Demographics
 India census, Keeripatti had a population of 10208. Males (5174) constitute 51% of the population and females (5034) 49%. Keeripatti has an average literacy rate of 64%, higher than the national average of 59.5%: male literacy is 72%, and female literacy is 55%. In Keeripatti, 11% of the population is under 6 years of age.

References

Cities and towns in Salem district